Ulyoty is a rural locality (a selo) and the administrative center of Ulyotovsky District of Zabaykalsky Krai, Russia. Population:

Geography
The village is about 120 km southwest of the regional capital Chita. There is a regional hospital and theater.

History
Ulyoty was founded in 1788 by Russians in order to collect yasak from the indigenous people to cultive crops. It became the administrative center of the district in 1926.

References

Rural localities in Zabaykalsky Krai
1788 establishments in the Russian Empire